Tommy Moe's Winter Extreme: Skiing & Snowboarding, known in Europe as Val d'Isere Championship, is a winter sports video game for the Super Nintendo Entertainment System that uses skiing and snowboarding as extreme sports in freestyle mode, training mode, or competition mode.

Gameplay

Competition mode gives players three chances to successfully complete the challenges. Otherwise, players get the "game over" screen advising them to try again. The freestyle mode plays like a video arcade racing game, the training mode allows players to use any course, and the competition mode is like the Winter Olympic Games. Controls can be modified and players can either use skis or snowboards. The game is named after US alpine skier Tommy Moe and is co-endorsed with Val-d'Isère, which hosted the men's downhill skiing event during the 1992 Winter Olympics in Albertville, France. The Japanese version of the game also features as endorsement from Italian ski equipment company Nordica, evident on the game's box.

Conditions can change on the course, including dawn, dusk, darkness, and afternoon conditions, and even forcing players to navigate through a winter storm. Once players reach the bottom of the hill in freestyle mode, they must use the ski lift in order to climb to the top of the next mountain. There are less than 70 seconds to get to the next checkpoint. The fastest speed that snowboards can go is 66 miles per hour (106.2 kilometres per hour) on hilly terrain and 88 miles per hour (141.6 kilometres per hour) on flat terrain.

A password allows players to continue their saved progress as they explore new regions of the mountain and refine their skiing or snowboarding skills.

Reception
GamePro assigned the game a rating of 4 out of 5 in their February 1994 issue. Game Players gave it a score of 77%. This game was voted the "best simulation game of 1994" in GameFan magazine's annual Megawards.

Notes

References

1994 video games
Electro Brain games
Pack-In-Video games
Skiing video games
Snowboarding video games
Sports video games set in France
Super Nintendo Entertainment System games
Super Nintendo Entertainment System-only games
Video games developed in France
Multiplayer and single-player video games
Virtual Studio games